This Is Our God is the seventeenth album in the live praise and worship series of contemporary worship music by Hillsong Church. It was recorded live at the Acer Arena on 9 March 2008 by Reuben Morgan, Joel Houston, Darlene Zschech, and the Hillsong Live Worship team with a crowd of over 10,000 worshippers. The album opened at No. 2 on the ARIA Top 50 Albums Chart in Australia.

Album information
This Is Our God is the first Hillsong album since 1996 on which Darlene Zschech has not appeared as worship pastor, since Reuben Morgan officially became the new worship pastor of Hillsong in 2008. It also features a greater variety of singers, as the church's most traditional worship leaders are not as heavily featured.

This is the third album released under their new name 'Hillsong Live'. Even though Hillsong has been using the 'Live' logo on their albums since 2006's Mighty To Save as well as listing these albums under 'Hillsong Live' on their website for some time, This Is Our God  is the first album to be officially released with 'Hillsong Live' listed as the artist name on the spine of the CD and DVD.

The majority of the songs were written by Reuben Morgan, Darlene Zschech, Joel Houston, Michael Guglielmucci, Matt Crocker, Brooke Fraser, and Ben Fielding.

"Healer"

On 21 August 2008, the album attracted controversy when a worship leader from Planetshakers Church and former member of the band Planetshakers, Michael Guglielmucci, admitted that in 2006 he had fabricated a story that he was suffering from cancer when he composed and then performed song "Healer", that appeared on the album. Guglielmucci later said that the story had been fabricated to hide a 16-year addiction to pornography. Representatives of churches with which Guglielmucci had affiliations told the press they were totally unaware of this situation. In an email sent to Hillsong members, the church's general manager, George Aghajanian, said the news was even a shock to Guglielmucci's own family and that the suspended pastor was seeking professional help. He was suspended from the church and actions taken to return the money obtained fraudulently. The track "Healer" has since then been removed from the track listing in future releases of the album.

Track listing
CD

DVD
 "Bible Reading & Prayer" (Isaiah 42:8-13) (Joel Houston)
 "Your Name High" (Joel Houston)
 "Run" (Joel Houston)
 "Across the Earth" (Matt Crocker)
 "Bible Reading" (Philippians 2:6-11)
 "This Is Our God" (Jill McCloghry and Reuben Morgan)
 "He Is Lord" (Annie Garratt and Marcus Temu)
 "High and Lifted Up" (Darlene Zschech)
 "Stronger" (Jad Gillies)
 "Bible Reading" (Isaiah 53:1-5) (Mike Guglielmucci)
 "Healer" (Mike Guglielmucci) [**Removed from current releases**]
 "You are Here (The Same Power) (Joel Houston) [**Removed from current releases**]
 "Bible Reading" (Isaiah 60:1-5, 18-22)
 "You Deserve" (Sam Knock)
 "Alive in You" [Author : Mike Guglielmucci & Scott Ligertwood] (Jonathon Douglass & Sam Knock)
 "Bible Reading" (Psalm 66) (Jill McCloghry)
 "Desert Song" (Brooke Fraser and Jill McCloghry)
 "Sing to the Lord" (Marty Sampson)
 "Where We Belong" (Joel Davies)
 "Bible Reading" (Hosea 6:1-3) (Brooke Fraser)
 "You'll Come" (Brooke Fraser and Darlene Zschech)
 "Turn Your Eyes Upon Jesus" (Brooke Fraser)
 "With Everything" (Joel Houston)
 "Benediction" (Revelation 4:8, 11; 5:9-10, 12, 13b; Hebrews 13:20-21; 2 Corinthians 13:14) (Robert Fergusson)
 "With Everything" (Reprise/Instrumental) [Drum : Rolf Wam Fjell, Bass : Ntando 'Bob' Mpofu, Keyboard : Kevin Lee]
Note: The DVD sub-menu "Song Selection" contains track listings for songs only. Spoken-word tracks may be accessed directly using navigation buttons while watching the feature

Documentary
 "This Is Our God"
 "Desert Song"
 "Turn Your Eyes Upon Jesus"
 "Your Name High" (Intro)
 "With Everything"

Personnel 

Adapted from AllMusic

 David Andrew – keyboards
 Grant Baker – audio engineer
 Matt Crocker – worship leader, backing vocal, songwriter
 Joel Davies – worship leader, backing vocal, songwriter
 Trent Dobson – audio engineer
 Jonathan Douglass – worship leader, backing vocal
 Ben Fielding – electric guitar
 Rolf Wam Fjell – drums
 Brooke Fraser – worship leader, backing vocal, acoustic guitar, songwriter
 Annie Garratt – worship leader, backing vocal
 Brandon Gillies – drums
 Jad Gillies – worship leader, backing vocal, electric guitar
 Mike Guglielmucci – worship leader, backing vocal, acoustic guitar, songwriter
 Autumn Hardman – keyboards
 Nigel Hendroff – electric guitar
 Joel Hingston – electric guitar
 Andrew Hood – electric guitar
 Bobbie Houston – senior pastor
 Brian Houston – senior pastor
 Joel Houston – creative director, worship leader, acoustic guitar, backing vocal, songwriter
 James Hurley – audio engineer
 Peter James – keyboards
 Roland James – keyboards
 Gabriel Kelly – drums
 Timon Klein – electric guitar
 Sam Knock – worship leader, backing vocal, acoustic guitar
 Braden Lang – vocals
 Kevin Lee – keyboards
 Steve Leroux – audio engineer
 Jill McCloghry – worship leader, backing vocal, acoustic guitar, songwriter
 Jim Monk – audio engineer
 Reuben Morgan – worship pastor, electric guitar, backing vocal, songwriter
 Ntando 'Bob' Mpofu – bass guitar
 Josh Nickel – audio engineer, post audio
 Sam O'Donell – drum technician
 Marty Sampson – worship leader, acoustic guitar
 Josh Telford – audio engineer
 Marcus Temu – worship leader, backing vocal
 Matthew Tennikoff – bass guitar
 Dylan Thomas – electric guitar
 Dean Ussher – electric guitar
 Peter Wallis – audio engineer
 David Ware – backing vocal
 Ben Whincop – audio engineer, post audio
 Darlene Zschech – senior worship leader, senior lead vocal, backing vocal, songwriter

Charts

Weekly charts

Year-end charts

References

External links
Hillsong page

2008 live albums
2008 video albums
Live video albums
Hillsong Music live albums
Hillsong Music video albums